The Dilazak is a Pashtun tribe, primarily living in Khyber-Pakhtunkhwa.

History
The Dilazak originally dwelled in eastern Afghanistan. They were among the earliest Pashtun tribes to have migrated to present-day northwestern Pakistan. The Dilazak expelled or subdued the local inhabitants  of the area. According to Aain-i-Akbari (Written around 1590 CE), the Dilazak were the only Pashtun tribe that possessed lands in Hazara Qaarlugh.

Around 1520, another Pashtun tribe, the Yousafzai, was expelled from Kabul by Mirza Ulugh Beg (March 22, 1394 in Sultaniyeh (Persia) – October 27, 1449 (Samarkand)), a Timurid ruler and paternal uncle of the Mughal Emperor Zahir-ud-din Muhammad Babur. The Yusufzai migrated to Peshawar valley where they sought and received help from the Dilazak. Later, the relationships between the two tribes deteriorated and a long war ensued. 20 years later, at the battle of Katlang, the Yousafzai pushed the Dilazak east of the Indus River under the leadership of Malik Ahmed Khan.

Return under Shahjahan
Most of the Dilazak returned during the reign of the Mughal King Shah ab-ud-din Muhammad Khurram alias Shah Jahan (Ruler of the Worlds) (January 5, 1592 – January 22, 1666), and settled in parts of Khyber Pakhtoonkhwa Province and Punjab Province of Pakistan in their old lands.
Saleh Khan and Sher Muhammad Khan settled with their family in Sara-e-Saleh and Tir, both in Haripur District of Khyber Pakhtoonkhwa Province in Pakistan.

References

External links
 Dilazak.org

Karlani Pashtun tribes
Articles with unsourced statements from January 2020